Kjell Håvard Jensen (born 3 June 1958) is a Norwegian politician for the Progress Party.

He served as a deputy representative to the Parliament of Norway from Østfold during the term 2013–2017. In total he met during 39 days of parliamentary session. Locally, he served as the mayor of Hobøl from 2007 to 2011.

References

1958 births
Living people
People from Østfold
Deputy members of the Storting
Progress Party (Norway) politicians
Mayors of places in Østfold
Place of birth missing (living people)